Parwan is a patwar circle and village in ILRC Nimera in Phagi Tehsil in Jaipur district, Rajasthan. Parwan is also a patwar circle for nearby villages, Khandooj, Dhunwaliya, Panwasoo Khera, Barh Mordi and Mordi.

In Parwan, there are 116 households with total population of 760 (with 54.34% males and 45.66% females), based on 2011 census. Total area of village is 6.26 km2.  There is one primary school in Parwan village.

References 

Villages in Jaipur district